Tetrernia teminitis is a moth in the family Crambidae. It was described by Edward Meyrick in 1890. It is found in Australia, where it has been recorded from Queensland.

References

Acentropinae
Moths described in 1890